Carl Leroy "Cully" Lidberg (August 25, 1900 – June 1987) was an American football fullback for the Green Bay Packers of the National Football League (NFL). He played college football for Hamline and Minnesota.

Biography
Lidberg was born on August 25, 1900, in Red Wing, Minnesota. He attended Red Wing High School in Red Wing. He played college football for Hamline and Minnesota before playing three seasons for the Green Bay Packers of the National Football League (NFL). He won league championships in 1929 and 1930. He died on June 26, 1987, in Minneapolis, Minnesota.

References

1900 births
1987 deaths
American football running backs
Minnesota Golden Gophers football players
Hamline Pipers football players
Green Bay Packers players